is a Japanese economist. He is a professor at the University of Tokyo.

Career
He received a B.A. from University of Tokyo in 1982 and a Ph.D. from Stanford University in 1989.

Recognition
 1999: Fellow, Econometric Society
 2002: Japanese Economic Association-Nakahara Prize
 2017: R. K. Cho Economics Prize

Selected publications

References

External links
 Personal web page
 Faculty profile at University of Tokyo

1959 births
Living people
People from Sapporo
20th-century Japanese  economists
21st-century Japanese economists
Game theorists
University of Tokyo alumni
Stanford University alumni
Fellows of the Econometric Society
Academic staff of the University of Tokyo
University of Pennsylvania faculty
Princeton University faculty
Presidents of the Japanese Economic Association